The Wichita Thunder are a minor league hockey team based in Wichita, Kansas. The team played in the Central Hockey League from 1992 until 2014, and then in the ECHL since the 2014–15 season. From 1992 until December 2009, the Thunder played in the Britt Brown Arena located in the northern Wichita suburb of Park City. In January 2010 (the second half of the 2009–10 season), the team began playing its home games at the newly built Intrust Bank Arena. The Thunder are currently the ECHL affiliate of the San Jose Sharks.

Franchise history

Central Hockey League
The Thunder was one of the first six original teams of the second iteration of the Central Hockey League, along with the Oklahoma City Blazers, Tulsa Oilers, Memphis RiverKings, Dallas Freeze and the Fort Worth Fire. Wichita played its first home game at Britt Brown Arena on November 4, 1992, in front of a crowd of 5,486. In the same season, the Thunder had its first sellout in team history when the crowd of 9,686 fans watched the Thunder defeat Oklahoma City 4–3.

The Thunder was originally coached by Gary Fay, but after a 6–20 start, he was replaced by Doug Shedden. The season was quickly turned around by Shedden, and it finished its first season with a 25–32–2 record. On April 5, 1993, the Thunder goaltender Robert Desjardins was named the first CHL Rookie of the Year. In the following two seasons, the Thunder was the regular season champion (Adams Cup) and playoff champion (William Levins Memorial Cup). Ron Handy was the Playoff Most Valuable Player for both seasons and was the only player in Central Hockey League history to win the award on multiple occasions. In the 1993–94 season, Doug Shedden won the Coach of the Year award, Robert Desjardins won the Regular Season Most Valuable Player award and Paul Jackson won the Scoring Champion award.

On May 14, 1995, Shedden resigned to become coach of the Louisiana IceGators of the East Coast Hockey League (ECHL). Don Jackson was hired as the new head coach on July 21, 1995. He led the Thunder to a 22–39–3 record and missed the playoffs for the second time in franchise history. On July 19, 1996, Jackson resigned to become head coach of the Kansas City Blades of the International Hockey League (IHL). Jackson was replaced by Bryan Wells to become the Thunder's fourth head coach in franchise history. Wells went on to coach the Thunder for five seasons, making the playoffs in four out of the five seasons he coached. On May 2, 2001, Wells was dismissed as head coach.

After the dismissal of Wells, the Thunder announced that James Latos would be the new head coach. In Latos' first season coaching, the team went 24–34–6 and was out of the playoffs. Latos was fired the following season after a disappointing start of 8–19–7. Five days after his dismissal, the Thunder announced that Derek Laxdal would become the team's new head coach. Laxdal went on to coach the Thunder for two seasons to an 87–58–8 record while securing two separate playoff places. On August 3, 2005, Laxdal announced his resignation to become the head coach of the ECHL's Idaho Steelheads.

Mark French took over as head coach from 2005 to 2007. During his tenure, he compiled a record of 70–59–16. He was fired mid-season in December 2007 with a 4–13 record. He went on to become the assistant coach of the AHL's Hershey Bears and the following season took them to a championship as head coach. The Thunder then named former player Rob Weingartner to lead the team. Weingartner played for the Thunder from 1992 to 1996 when he was a member of two championship teams. Weingartner compiled a record of 16–29–2 during his tenure. He has since become the head coach of the Western States Hockey League's Wichita Jr. Thunder.

Brent Bilodeau was hired during the 2008 off-season and led the team for two seasons and a record of 22–48–0. He was fired early in his second season and became the assistant coach of the Western Hockey League's Tri-City Americans for two seasons. After the Thunder fired Bilodeau nine games into the 2009–10 season, Jason Duda was given the job on an interim basis while on injured reserve. Duda owns several franchise records from his Thunder career, scoring 870 points in 14 seasons. He finished the season with a 7–43–5 record and became an assistant coach under the next head coach, Kevin McClelland.

ECHL
On October 7, 2014, soon before the 2014–15 CHL season was set to begin, it was announced that the Central Hockey League had ceased operations and the Thunder, along with the Allen Americans, Brampton Beast, Quad City Mallards, Missouri Mavericks, Rapid City Rush and Tulsa Oilers, were all approved for membership into the ECHL for the 2014–15 season. The team finished fifth out of seven teams in the Central Division, scoring 73 points out of 144.

On April 16, 2016, the Thunder announced that the team would not renew McClelland's contract for the 2016–17 season. He had been with the Thunder since 2010 and guided the team for six seasons becoming the longest tenured coach in Thunder history, leading the team for 408 games. During his time in Wichita, McClelland compiled a record of 194–166–48, earning a playoff spot in his first season and taking the team to the playoff finals in the following two seasons while still in the CHL. However, he failed to lead the team into the ECHL playoffs in his two seasons leading the team in the ECHL and the Thunder finished last in the overall standings in the 2015–16 season.

Malcolm Cameron was announced as the new head coach on May 20, 2016. One of his stated intentions in his opening press conference was to establish the Thunder's first NHL affiliation for the upcoming season. On July 4, 2016, the Ottawa Senators' assistant general manager, Randy Lee, said that his team was in negotiations for an affiliation with the Thunder for the 2016–17 season. The affiliation with the Senators and their American Hockey League affiliate, the Binghamton Senators, was finally confirmed on July 14. After one season, the Thunder changed affiliations to the Edmonton Oilers (NHL) and Bakersfield Condors (AHL). After three seasons, and one playoff appearance, Cameron was not offered an extension.

On May 15, 2019, the Thunder announced that the former Tulsa Oilers' head coach Bruce Ramsay would be Cameron's replacement.

Season-by-season records

Players

Current roster
Updated January 28, 2023.

Retired numbers
9 - Ron Handy
11 - Jason Duda
15 - Rob Weingartner
35 - Robert Desjardins
38 - Travis Clayton

Notable NHL alumni
List of Wichita Thunder alumni who played more than 25 games in Wichita and 25 or more games in the National Hockey League.

Leaders

Head coaches

General managers

Awards and trophies
The following lists the league awards which have been won by the Thunder team and its players.

ECHL
Most Valuable Player
 Anthony Beauregard: 2020–21

Coach of the Year
Bruce Ramsay: 2020–21

General Manager of the Year
Bruce Ramsay: 2020–21

Community Service Award
 Jeremy Beaudry: 2017–18

CHL

William Levins Memorial Cup
 1993–94, 1994–95

Adams Cup
 1993–94, 1994–95

Coach of the Year
 Doug Shedden: 1993–94
 Kevin McClelland: 2011–12

Joe Burton Award
 Jason Duda: 2004–05

Ken McKenzie Trophy
 Paul Jackson: 1993–94

Playoff Most Valuable Player
Ron Handy: 1993–94, 1994–95

Most Outstanding Defenseman
 Paul Esdale: 2004–05
 Andrew Martens: 2010–11
 Kevin Young: 2012–13
Rick Kozuback Award
 Jason Duda: 2009–10

Rookie of the Year
 Robert Desjardins: 1992–93
 Cory Dosdall: 1996–97
 David Beauregard: 1997–98

All-Star Game Most Valuable Player (North)
 Joe Blaznek: 2005–06

References

External links

Wichita Thunder official web site

 
Ice hockey clubs established in 1992
Ice hockey teams in Kansas
1992 establishments in Kansas
ECHL teams
Central Hockey League teams
Ottawa Senators minor league affiliates
Edmonton Oilers minor league affiliates
San Jose Sharks minor league affiliates